The Vampire Diaries, an American supernatural drama, was renewed for a seventh season by The CW on January 11, 2015, and premiered on October 8, 2015. On March 11, 2016, The CW renewed The Vampire Diaries for an eighth season, which was confirmed to be the final one in July 2016.

Cast

Main
 Paul Wesley as Stefan Salvatore
 Ian Somerhalder as Damon Salvatore
 Kat Graham as Bonnie Bennett
 Candice King as Caroline Forbes
 Zach Roerig as Matt Donovan
 Matt Davis as Alaric Saltzman
 Michael Malarkey as Enzo St. John

Recurring

 Elizabeth Blackmore as Valerie Tulle
 Scarlett Byrne as Nora Hildegard
 Teressa Liane as Mary-Louise
 Todd Lasance as Julian
 Leslie-Anne Huff as Rayna Cruz
 Jaiden Kaine as Beau
 Ana Nogueira as Penny Ares
 Mouzam Makkar as Alex St. John
 Lily Rose Mumford as Josie Saltzman
 Tierney Mumford as Lizzie Saltzman

Special guest
 Annie Wersching as Lily Salvatore
 Michael Trevino as Tyler Lockwood
 Joseph Morgan as Klaus Mikaelson

Guest

 Jodi Lyn O'Keefe as Jo Laughlin (possessed by Florence)
 Tim Kang as Oscar (himself; possessed by an unknown phoenix stone vampire)
 Alex Mauriello as Krystal
 Aisha Duran as Virginia St. John
 Evan Gamble as Henry Wattles
 Ryan Dorsey as Marty Hammond (possessed by Stefan Salvatore)
 Justice Leak as Malcolm
 John Charles Meyer as young Giuseppe Salvatore
 Gavin Casalegno as young Damon Salvatore
 Luke Judy as young Stefan Salvatore
 Euseph Messiah as Ellis
 Nina Dobrev as Elena Gilbert (voice only; uncredited)

Episodes

Casting
The cast features Paul Wesley as Stefan Salvatore, Ian Somerhalder as Damon Salvatore, Kat Graham as Bonnie Bennett, Candice Accola as Caroline Forbes and Zach Roerig as Matt Donovan.

On April 6, 2015, it was announced that Nina Dobrev would be leaving after the sixth season and that Michael Trevino would only appear as a guest on the new season. On April 11, 2015, it was announced that Steven R. McQueen would be departing the show.

On July 15, 2015, it was announced that Scarlett Byrne and Teressa Liane were hired to play Nora and Mary Louise, respectively. Nora and Mary Louise are described as extremely powerful and protective with each other, because it is the first same-sex couple in the series; additionally it is reported that Elizabeth Blackmore was chosen to give life to Valerie. The trio is part of the family of heretics adopted by Lily Salvatore. On November 5, it was announced that Leslie-Anne Huff was hired to play Rayna, a vampire huntress.

Reception

Critical response
Based on 13 reviews, the 7th season currently holds a 77% on Rotten Tomatoes with an average rating of 7.75 out of 10. The site's critics consensus reads, "Despite an Elena-less season, Vampire Diaries still has plenty of fleshed out plot and new characters for fans to sink their teeth into."

Ratings

References

7
 
2015 American television seasons
2016 American television seasons